Fluo-4 is used to measure calcium (Ca2+) concentrations inside living cells, and is often used for high-throughput screening of receptor ligands and calcium permeable ion channels.

The green-fluorescent calcium indicator, Fluo-4, is an improved version of the calcium indicator, Fluo-3. It is commonly used as the non-fluorescent acetoxymethyl ester (Fluo-4 AM) which is cleaved inside the cell to give the free, fluorescent Fluo-4. It loads faster, is brighter at equivalent concentrations and is well-excited by the 488 nm line of the argon-ion laser which is often used in biological research laboratories. Fluo-4 and its cell-permeable AM ester are available from a few commercial vendors.

References

Biochemistry methods
Cell imaging
Chelating agents
Fluorone dyes
Fluoroarenes
Acetic acids
Phenol ethers
Anilines